Matalam, officially the Municipality of Matalam (Jawi: ايڠايد نو ماتلم), is a 1st class municipality in the province of Cotabato, Philippines. According to the 2020 census, it has a population of 81,355 people.

History
The municipality of Matalam before its creation into a regular municipality was just a mere sitio of Kilada called "Crossing M'lang" within the jurisdiction of the municipality of Kabacan. Because of its strategic location coupled with the strong desire of the people, petitioned the provincial and national government for its creation into a regular municipality. It was formally separated from Kabacan and was created into a municipality on December 29, 1961, making Matalam as the 32nd Municipality of Cotabato. This municipality was named after the late illustrious father of the Province, Governor Datu Udtog Matalam, in acknowledgement of his untiring efforts for the development and creation of the place. MPDC Office_LGU-Matalam, Cotabato

Geography
Matalam is a palm shape municipality. It is centrally located right at the heart of the province of Cotabato. It is bounded on the east by the municipality of Kidapawan; on the west by Kabacan; on the south by M’lang and on the north by the Municipalities of President Roxas and Carmen. It lies along the Cotabato-Davao National Highway occupying the large portion of the Arakan Valley.

Barangays
Matalam is politically subdivided into 34 barangays.

Climate

Matalam belongs to the 4th type of climate, which is characterized by a more or less even distribution of rainfall throughout the year. The heaviest rainfall months of the year are May, June and July. The prevailing wind direction is from west to east. Matalam is geographically located outside typhoon belt.

Demographics

Transportation

Highway accidents 

A number of significant road accidents have occurred on the main highway in Matalam since 2018, which include motorcycle and other vehicular accidents. In 2018, two women died in a motorcycle accident after running over the passing dump truck along the national highway. Cotabato-based journalist Moh Saaduddin mourned the demise of a colleague after they were killed in a motorcycle accident that rammed a cargo truck. On December 19, 2018, 16 people were injured in a Matalam road crash.

Three people were killed and two other injured after Toyota Hilux pickup truck slammed a passing tricycle and a vehicle along Matalam to Kabacan highway road in January 2019. On June 1, 2019, three died in a freak accident involving community FM radio Benny Queman, who was detained by police after hitting motorcycle along Matalam to M'lang highway road in the Philippines. On July 13, 2019, four people died and other three were injured in highway road accident in Matalam,.

Economy

Matalam's market and other commercial establishments are the hub of activity in the area. Commercial establishments in the town include the following: bakeries, gasoline dealers, copra dealers, sari-sari stores, beta houses, carenderias, hardware, grains retailers, fish dealers, and many more.

Rice, corn and copra are commodities which are very much in demand in the local trade. Due to lack of supply, rice and corn grits are sometimes brought in from the mainland. These are retailed in the market for local consumption.

Mineral resources is found on the mountainous portion with properties such as shale sandstone, conglomerate, limestone, igneous rock and other volcanic materials.

References

External links
Matalam Profile at the DTI Cities and Municipalities Competitive Index
[ Philippine Standard Geographic Code]
Philippine Census Information

Municipalities of Cotabato